Pecado de amor may refer to:
 Pecado de amor (film), a 1961 Argentine musical drama film
 Pecado de amor (1978 TV series), a Mexican telenovela
 Pecado de amor (1995 TV series), a Venezuelan telenovela